The CONCACAF Gold Cup is North America's major tournament in senior men's football and determines the continental champion. Until 1989, the tournament was known as CONCACAF Championship. It is currently held every two years. From 1996 to 2005, nations from other confederations have regularly joined the tournament as invitees. In earlier editions, the continental championship was held in different countries, but since the inception of the Gold Cup in 1991, the United States are constant hosts or co-hosts.

From 1973 to 1989, the tournament doubled as the confederation's World Cup qualification. CONCACAF's representative team at the FIFA Confederations Cup was decided by a play-off between the winners of the last two tournament editions in 2015 via the CONCACAF Cup, but was then discontinued along with the Confederations Cup.

Since the inaugural tournament in 1963, the Gold Cup was held 26 times and has been won by seven different nations, most often by Mexico (11 titles).

Saint Vincent and the Grenadines became a full FIFA-member in 1988, but entered the qualification process for a continental championship for the first time in 1993. They qualified once for a major tournament: The CONCACAF Gold Cup in 1996. Out of the 27 nations which have participated at Gold Cups or its preceding tournaments, Saint Vincent and the Grenadines are the only one which have yet to score a goal.

Record at the CONCACAF Championship/Gold Cup

Match Overview

1996 Squad

Coach:  Lenny Taylor

References

External links
RSSSF archives and results
Soccerway database

Countries at the CONCACAF Gold Cup
Gold Cup